ROKS Cheonghaejin (ASR-21) is the only ship of the Cheonghaejin-class submarine rescue ship in the Republic of Korea Navy. She is named after the military headquarter, Cheonghaejin.

Design 

Her operations include rescuing trapped sailors in submarines, naval operation support for submarines, underwater research and mapping support, and recovery of sunk vessels.

Once all nine Son Wonil-class submarines are delivered to the Republic of Korea Navy, another ASR ship of the same class is planned to be built.

Construction and career 
ROKS Cheonghaejin was launched on 18 October 1995 by Daewoo Shipbuilding and commissioned on 2 December 1996.

She salvaged a North Korean  submarine in 1998.

She salvaged  #357 that was sunk during the naval clash in 2002 with North Korea.

Gallery

References

1995 ships
Ships built by Hanjin Heavy Industries
Auxiliary ships of the Republic of Korea Navy